A metaphor is a figure of speech that, for rhetorical effect, directly refers to one thing by mentioning another. It may provide (or obscure) clarity or identify hidden similarities between two different ideas. Metaphors are often compared with other types of figurative language, such as antithesis, hyperbole, metonymy, and simile. One of the most commonly cited examples of a metaphor in English literature comes from the "All the world's a stage" monologue from As You Like It:

All the world's a stage,
And all the men and women merely players;
They have their exits and their entrances 
And one man in his time plays many parts,
His Acts being seven ages. At first, the infant...
—William Shakespeare, As You Like It, 2/7

This quotation expresses a metaphor because the world is not literally a stage, and most humans are not literally actors and actresses playing roles. By asserting that the world is a stage, Shakespeare uses points of comparison between the world and a stage to convey an understanding about the mechanics of the world and the behavior of the people within it.

In the ancient Hebrew psalms (around 1000 B.C.), one finds already vivid and poetic examples of metaphor such as, "The Lord is my rock, my fortress and my deliverer; my God is my rock, in whom I take refuge, my shield and the horn of my salvation, my stronghold” and “The Lord is my shepherd, I shall not want”. Some recent linguistic theories view all language in essence as metaphorical.

The word metaphor itself is a metaphor, coming from a Greek term meaning "transference (of ownership)". The user of a metaphor alters the reference of the word, "carrying" it from one semantic "realm" to another. The new meaning of the word might be derived from an analogy between the two semantic realms, but also from other reasons such as the distortion of the semantic realm - for example in sarcasm.

Etymology 

The English word metaphor derives from the 16th-century Old French word métaphore, which comes from the Latin metaphora, "carrying over", and in turn from the Greek μεταφορά (metaphorá), "transference (of ownership)", from μεταφέρω (metapherō), "to carry over", "to transfer" and that from μετά (meta), "behind", "along with", "across" + φέρω (pherō), "to bear", "to carry".

Parts of a metaphor

The Philosophy of Rhetoric (1937) by rhetorician I. A. Richards describes a metaphor as having two parts: the tenor and the vehicle. The tenor is the subject to which attributes are ascribed. The vehicle is the object whose attributes are borrowed. In the previous example, "the world" is compared to a stage, describing it with the attributes of "the stage"; "the world" is the tenor, and "a stage" is the vehicle; "men and women" is the secondary tenor, and "players" is the secondary vehicle.

Other writers employ the general terms 'ground' and 'figure' to denote the tenor and the vehicle. Cognitive linguistics uses the terms 'target' and 'source', respectively.

Psychologist Julian Jaynes coined the terms 'metaphrand' and 'metaphier', plus two new concepts, 'paraphrand' and 'paraphier'.

'Metaphrand' is equivalent to the metaphor-theory terms 'tenor', 'target', and 'ground'. 'Metaphier' is equivalent to the metaphor-theory terms 'vehicle', 'figure', and 'source'. In a simple metaphor, an obvious attribute of the metaphier exactly characterizes the metaphrand (e.g. the ship plowed the seas). With an inexact metaphor, however, a metaphier might have associated attributes or nuances – its paraphiers – that enrich the metaphor because they "project back" to the metaphrand, potentially creating new ideas – the paraphrands – associated thereafter with the metaphrand or even leading to a new metaphor. For example, in the metaphor "Pat is a tornado", the metaphrand is "Pat", the metaphier is "tornado". As metaphier, "tornado" carries paraphiers such as power, storm and wind, counterclockwise motion, and danger, threat, destruction, etc. The metaphoric meaning of "tornado" is inexact: one might understand that 'Pat is powerfully destructive' through the paraphrand of physical and emotional destruction; another person might understand the metaphor as 'Pat can spin out of control'. In the latter case, the paraphier of 'spinning motion' has become the paraphrand 'psychological spin', suggesting an entirely new metaphor for emotional unpredictability, a possibly apt description for a human being hardly applicable to a tornado.
Based on his analysis, Jaynes claims that metaphors not only enhance description, but "increase enormously our powers of perception...and our understanding of [the world], and literally create new objects".

As a type of comparison 

Metaphors are most frequently compared with similes. It is said, for instance, that a metaphor is 'a condensed analogy' or 'analogical fusion' or that they 'operate in a similar fashion' or are 'based on the same mental process' or yet that 'the basic processes of analogy are at work in metaphor'. It is also pointed out that 'a border between metaphor and analogy is fuzzy'  and 'the difference between them might be described (metaphorically) as the distance between things being compared'. A metaphor asserts the objects in the comparison are identical on the point of comparison, while a simile merely asserts a similarity through use of words such as "like" or "as". For this reason a common-type metaphor is generally considered more forceful than a simile.

The metaphor category contains these specialized types:
 Allegory: An extended metaphor wherein a story illustrates an important attribute of the subject.
 Antithesis: A rhetorical contrast of ideas by means of parallel arrangements of words, clauses, or sentences.
 Catachresis: A mixed metaphor, sometimes used by design and sometimes by accident (a rhetorical fault).
 Hyperbole: Excessive exaggeration to illustrate a point.
 Parable: An extended metaphor told as an anecdote to illustrate or teach a moral or spiritual lesson, such as in Aesop's fables or Jesus' teaching method as told in the Bible.
 Pun: A verbal device by which multiple definitions of a word or its homophones are used to give a sentence multiple valid readings, typically to humorous effect.
 Similitude: An extended simile or metaphor that has a picture part (Bildhälfte), a reality part (Sachhälfte), and a point of comparison (tertium comparationis). Similitudes are found in the parables of Jesus.

Metaphor vs metonymy

Metaphor is distinct from metonymy, both constituting two fundamental modes of thought. Metaphor works by bringing together concepts from different conceptual domains, whereas metonymy uses one element from a given domain to refer to another closely related element. A metaphor creates new links between otherwise distinct conceptual domains, whereas a metonymy relies on pre-existent links within them.

For example, in the phrase "lands belonging to the crown", the word "crown" is a metonymy because some monarchs do indeed wear a crown, physically. In other words, there is a pre-existent link between "crown" and "monarchy". On the other hand, when Ghil'ad Zuckermann argues that the Israeli language is a "phoenicuckoo cross with some magpie characteristics", he is using a metaphor. There is no physical link between a language and a bird. The reason the metaphors "phoenix" and "cuckoo" are used is that on the one hand hybridic "Israeli" is based on Hebrew, which, like a phoenix, rises from the ashes; and on the other hand, hybridic "Israeli" is based on Yiddish, which like a cuckoo, lays its egg in the nest of another bird, tricking it to believe that it is its own egg. Furthermore, the metaphor "magpie" is employed because, according to Zuckermann, hybridic "Israeli" displays the characteristics of a magpie, "stealing" from languages such as Arabic and English.

Subtypes

A dead metaphor is a metaphor in which the sense of a transferred image has become absent. The phrases "to grasp a concept" and "to gather what you've understood" use physical action as a metaphor for understanding. The audience does not need to visualize the action; dead metaphors normally go unnoticed. Some distinguish between a dead metaphor and a cliché. Others use "dead metaphor" to denote both.

A mixed metaphor is a metaphor that leaps from one identification to a second inconsistent with the first, e.g.:

This form is often used as a parody of metaphor itself:

An extended metaphor, or conceit, sets up a principal subject with several subsidiary subjects or comparisons. In the above quote from As You Like It, the world is first described as a stage and then the subsidiary subjects men and women are further described in the same context.

An implicit metaphor has no specified tenor, although the vehicle is present. M. H. Abrams offers the following as an example of an implicit metaphor: "That reed was too frail to survive the storm of its sorrows". The reed is the vehicle for the implicit tenor, someone's death, and the "storm" is the vehicle for the person's "sorrows".

Metaphor can serve as a device for persuading an audience of the user's argument or thesis, the so-called rhetorical metaphor.

In rhetoric and literature 

Aristotle writes in his work the Rhetoric that metaphors make learning pleasant: "To learn easily is naturally pleasant to all people, and words signify something, so whatever words create knowledge in us are the pleasantest." When discussing Aristotle's  Rhetoric, Jan Garret stated "metaphor most brings about learning; for when [Homer] calls old age "stubble", he creates understanding and knowledge through the genus, since both old age and stubble are [species of the genus of] things that have lost their bloom." Metaphors, according to Aristotle, have "qualities of the exotic and the fascinating; but at the same time we recognize that strangers do not have the same rights as our fellow citizens".

Educational psychologist Andrew Ortony gives more explicit detail: "Metaphors are necessary as a communicative device because they allow the transfer of coherent chunks of characteristics -- perceptual, cognitive, emotional and experiential -- from a vehicle which is known to a topic which is less so. In so doing they circumvent the problem of specifying one by one each of the often unnameable and innumerable characteristics; they avoid discretizing the perceived continuity of experience and are thus closer to experience and consequently more vivid and memorable."

As style in speech and writing

As a characteristic of speech and writing, metaphors can serve the poetic imagination. This allows Sylvia Plath, in her poem "Cut", to compare the blood issuing from her cut thumb to the running of a million soldiers, "redcoats, every one"; and enabling Robert Frost, in "The Road Not Taken", to compare a life to a journey.

Metaphors can be implied and extended throughout pieces of literature.

Larger applications 

Sonja K. Foss characterizes metaphors as "nonliteral comparisons in which a word or phrase from one domain of experience is applied to another domain".
She argues that since reality is mediated by the language we use to describe it, the metaphors we use shape the world and our interactions to it.

The term metaphor is used to describe more basic or general aspects of experience and cognition:
 A cognitive metaphor is the association of object to an experience outside the object's environment
 A conceptual metaphor is an underlying association that is systematic in both language and thought
 A root metaphor is the underlying worldview that shapes an individual's understanding of a situation
 A nonlinguistic metaphor is an association between two nonlinguistic realms of experience
 A visual metaphor uses an image to create the link between different ideas

Conceptual metaphors 

Some theorists have suggested that metaphors are not merely stylistic, but that they are cognitively important as well. In Metaphors We Live By, George Lakoff and Mark Johnson argue that metaphors are pervasive in everyday life, not just in language, but also in thought and action. A common definition of metaphor can be described as a comparison that shows how two things that are not alike in most ways are similar in another important way. They explain how a metaphor is simply understanding and experiencing one kind of thing in terms of another, called a "conduit metaphor". A speaker can put ideas or objects into containers, and then send them along a conduit to a listener who removes the object from the container to make meaning of it. Thus, communication is something that ideas go into, and the container is separate from the ideas themselves. Lakoff and Johnson give several examples of daily metaphors in use, including "argument is war" and "time is money". Metaphors are widely used in context to describe personal meaning. The authors suggest that communication can be viewed as a machine: "Communication is not what one does with the machine, but is the machine itself."

Experimental evidence shows that "priming" people with material from one area will influence how they perform tasks and interpret language in a metaphorically related area.

As a foundation of our conceptual system
Cognitive linguists emphasize that metaphors serve to facilitate the understanding of one conceptual domain—typically an abstraction such as "life", "theories" or "ideas"—through expressions that relate to another, more familiar conceptual domain—typically more concrete, such as "journey", "buildings" or "food". For example: we devour a book of raw facts, try to digest them, stew over them, let them simmer on the back-burner, regurgitate them in discussions, and cook up explanations, hoping they do not seem half-baked.

Lakoff and Johnson greatly contributed to establishing the importance of conceptual metaphor as a framework for thinking in language, leading scholars to investigate the original ways in which writers used novel metaphors and question the fundamental frameworks of thinking in conceptual metaphors.

From a sociological, cultural, or philosophical perspective, one asks to what extent ideologies maintain and impose conceptual patterns of thought by introducing, supporting, and adapting fundamental patterns of thinking metaphorically. To what extent does the ideology fashion and refashion the idea of the nation as a container with borders? How are enemies and outsiders represented? As diseases? As attackers? How are the metaphoric paths of fate, destiny, history, and progress represented? As the opening of an eternal monumental moment (German fascism)? Or as the path to communism (in Russian or Czech for example)?

Some cognitive scholars have attempted to take on board the idea that different languages have evolved radically different concepts and conceptual metaphors, while others hold to the Sapir-Whorf hypothesis. German philologist Wilhelm von Humboldt contributed significantly to this debate on the relationship between culture, language, and linguistic communities. Humboldt remains, however, relatively unknown in English-speaking nations. Andrew Goatly, in "Washing the Brain", takes on board the dual problem of conceptual metaphor as a framework implicit in the language as a system and the way individuals and ideologies negotiate conceptual metaphors. Neural biological research suggests some metaphors are innate, as demonstrated by reduced metaphorical understanding in psychopathy.

James W. Underhill, in Creating Worldviews: Ideology, Metaphor & Language (Edinburgh UP), considers the way individual speech adopts and reinforces certain metaphoric paradigms. This involves a critique of both communist and fascist discourse. Underhill's studies are situated in Czech and German, which allows him to demonstrate the ways individuals are thinking both within and resisting the modes by which ideologies seek to appropriate key concepts such as "the people", "the state", "history", and "struggle".

Though metaphors can be considered to be "in" language, Underhill's chapter on French, English and ethnolinguistics demonstrates that we cannot conceive of language or languages in anything other than metaphoric terms.

Nonlinguistic metaphors 

Metaphors can map experience between two nonlinguistic realms. Musicologist Leonard B. Meyer demonstrated how purely rhythmic and harmonic events can express human emotions. It is an open question whether synesthesia experiences are a sensory version of metaphor, the "source" domain being the presented stimulus, such as a musical tone, and the target domain, being the experience in another modality, such as color.

Art theorist Robert Vischer argued that when we look at a painting, we "feel ourselves into it" by imagining our body in the posture of a nonhuman or inanimate object in the painting. For example, the painting The Lonely Tree by Caspar David Friedrich shows a tree with contorted, barren limbs. Looking at the painting, we imagine our limbs in a similarly contorted and barren shape, evoking a feeling of strain and distress. Nonlinguistic metaphors may be the foundation of our experience of visual and musical art, as well as dance and other art forms.

In historical linguistics 
In historical onomasiology or in historical linguistics, a metaphor is defined as a semantic change based on a similarity in form or function between the original concept and the target concept named by a word.

For example, mouse: small, gray rodent with a long tail → small, gray computer device with a long cord.

Some recent linguistic theories view all language in essence as metaphorical.

Historical theories

Aristotle's discusses the creation of metaphors at the end of his Poetics: "But the greatest thing by far is to be a master of metaphor. It is the one thing that cannot be learnt from others; and it is also a sign of genius, since a good metaphor implies an intuitive perception of the similarity in dissimilars."

Baroque literary theorist Emanuele Tesauro defines the metaphor "the most witty and acute, the most strange and marvelous, the most pleasant and useful, the most eloquent and fecund part of the human intellect". There is, he suggests, something divine in metaphor: the world itself is God's poem and metaphor is not just a literary or rhetorical figure but an analytic tool that can penetrate the mysteries of God and His creation.

Friedrich Nietzsche makes metaphor the conceptual center of his early theory of society in On Truth and Lies in the Non-Moral Sense. Some sociologists have found his essay useful for thinking about metaphors used in society and for reflecting on their own use of metaphor. Sociologists of religion note the importance of metaphor in religious worldviews, and that it is impossible to think sociologically about religion without metaphor.

See also 

 Alliteration
 Camel's nose
 Colemanballs
 Conceptual blending
 Description
 Experience model
 Hypocatastasis
 Ideasthesia
 List of English-language metaphors
 Literal and figurative language
 Metaphor identification procedure
 Metaphor in philosophy
 Metonymy
 Misnomer
 Origin of language
 Origin of speech
 Pataphor
 Personification
 Reification (fallacy)
 Sarcasm
 Simile
 Synecdoche
 Analogy
 Tertium comparationis
 War as metaphor
 World Hypotheses

Notes

References

Citations

Sources 

 
 Stefano Arduini (2007). (ed.) Metaphors, Roma, Edizioni di Storia e Letteratura.
 Aristotle. Poetics. Trans. I. Bywater. In The Complete Works of Aristotle: The Revised Oxford Translation. (1984). 2 Vols. Ed. Jonathan Barnes. Princeton, NJ: Princeton University Press.
 Max Black (1954). Metaphor, Proceedings of the Aristotelian Society, 55, pp. 273–294.
 Max Black (1962). Models and metaphors: Studies in language and philosophy, Ithaca: Cornell University Press.
 Max Black (1979). More about Metaphor, in A. Ortony (ed) Metaphor & Thought.
 Clive Cazeaux (2007). Metaphor and Continental Philosophy: From Kant to Derrida. New York, NY: Routledge.
 L. J. Cohen (1979). The Semantics of Metaphor, in A. Ortony (ed.), Metaphor & Thought.
 Donald Davidson. (1978). "What Metaphors Mean." Reprinted in Inquiries into Truth and Interpretation. (1984). Oxford, England: Oxford University Press.
 Jacques Derrida (1982). "White Mythology: Metaphor in the Text of Philosophy." In Margins of Philosophy. Trans. Alan Bass. Chicago, University of Chicago Press.
 
 
 
 Lakoff, G. & Johnson, M. Metaphors We Live By (IL: University of Chicago Press, 1980), Chapters 1–3. (pp. 3–13).
 .
 
 
 McKinnon, AM. (2012). 'Metaphors in and for the Sociology of Religion: Towards a Theory after Nietzsche'. Journal of Contemporary Religion, vol 27, no. 2, pp. 203–216.  
 David Punter (2007). Metaphor, London, Routledge.
 Paul Ricoeur (1975). The Rule of Metaphor: Multi-Disciplinary Studies in the Creation of Meaning in Language, trans. Robert Czerny with Kathleen McLaughlin and John Costello, S. J., London: Routledge and Kegan Paul 1978. (Toronto: University of Toronto Press 1977)
 I. A. Richards. (1936). The Philosophy of Rhetoric. Oxford, Oxford University Press.
 John Searle (1979). "Metaphor," in A. Ortony (ed.) Metaphor and Thought, Cambridge University Press.
 Underhill, James W., Creating Worldviews: Metaphor, Ideology & Language, Edinburgh UP, 2011.

External links

 
 A short history of metaphor
 Audio illustrations of metaphor as figure of speech
 Top Ten Metaphors of 2008
 Shakespeare's Metaphors
 Definition and Examples
 Metaphor Examples (categorized)
 List of ancient Greek words starting with μετα-, on Perseus
 Metaphor and Phenomenology article in the Internet Encyclopedia of Philosophy
 Metaphors algebra
 

 
 
Figures of speech
Rhetorical techniques
Tropes by type